Vic-le-Comte (Occitan: Vic la Còmte) is a commune in the Puy-de-Dôme  department in Auvergne in central France.

Population

See also
Communes of the Puy-de-Dôme department

References

Viclecomte